Michael N. "Mickey" Switalski (born January 11, 1955) is a politician from the U.S. state of Michigan. He was a Democratic member of the Michigan Senate, representing the 10th district from 2003 to 2011. His district is located in central Macomb County and includes the cities of Sterling Heights and Roseville. Previously he was a member of the Michigan House of Representatives from 1999 to 2003.

Early life
Switalski graduated from Roseville High School in 1973.  He graduated from Louisiana State University in 1977 with a bachelor's degree in Classical Languages, and in 1981 earned a master's degree in History.  He graduated from the University of Aberdeen in Scotland in 1982 with an M. Litt. in Politics.

Career 
Switalski worked as a sports editor for the Utica Advisor and C&G Newspapers, and contributed to the Detroit Free Press and the Kansas City Star.  He served as the Chief of Labor Relations at the Detroit Arsenal Tank Plant from 1985 to 1993.

Switalski was elected to the Roseville City Council in 1989 and was elected Macomb County Commissioner in 1992.  In 1998, he was elected to the Michigan State House of Representatives, representing the 27th district.  In 2002, he was elected to the Michigan State Senate.  He was re-elected in 2006. On March 22, 2009, Switalski announced that he will challenge U.S Representative from the 12th district Sander Levin for the Democratic ticket of this position. In the August 3, 2010 primary Sander Levin defeated Switalski by approximately 3 to 1.

In 2013, Switalski served the city of Roseville as its treasurer, until 2017.

Personal life 
Switalski married Roma Heaney in Glasgow, Scotland in 1985.  He has a son, Liam, who was born in 1993. They live in Roseville, Michigan.

References

External links
 Michigan Senate - Michael Switalski official government website
Project Vote Smart - Senator Michael N. 'Mickey' Switalski (MI) profile
Follow the Money - Michael N Switalski
2006 2004 2002 2000 1998 campaign contributions
Michigan Senate Democratic Caucus
Michigan Liberal - SD10

1955 births
Living people
Michigan state senators
Members of the Michigan House of Representatives
Alumni of the University of Aberdeen
Louisiana State University alumni
People from Hamtramck, Michigan
People from Roseville, Michigan
American Christians